Mmabatho Olive Mokause is a South African politician serving as a permanent delegate to the National Council of Provinces from the Northern Cape since March 2020. She is a member of the Economic Freedom Fighters (EFF). Mokause was a Member of the Northern Cape Provincial Legislature from May 2014 to April 2015. She was appointed to the National Assembly of South Africa, the lower house of Parliament, in April 2015 and served in the chamber until January 2018. After the May 2019 general election, she returned to the National Assembly, but resigned in September. In March 2020, she was selected to represent the EFF in the upper house.

Life and career
Mokause is a resident of Kuruman in the Northern Cape.

Mokause has been a party member of the Economic Freedom Fighters since its inception and was appointed to serve on the inaugural Central Command Team, the party's highest decision-making body. She was elected to the Northern Cape Provincial Legislature in the general election held on 7 May 2014 as one of two party representatives and took office as a Member of the Provincial Legislature (MPL) on 21 May 2014.

In November 2014, Mokause was assaulted while attending the EFF provincial conference in the Northern Cape.

In April 2015, she resigned as an MPL as she was set to be deployed to Parliament. She was sworn in as a Member of the National Assembly on 21 April 2015. In October 2017, the Diamond Fields Advertiser reported that the EFF central command had instructed Mokause to "resign immediately" from Parliament. Her resignation came into effect on 1 January 2018.

However, Mokause returned to the National Assembly following the May 2019 general election. She served as an MP for less than four months before resigning on 9 September. At the party's national elective conference in December 2019, she was re-elected as a member of the Central Command Team. She was sworn in as a Member of the National Council of Provinces, the upper house, in March 2020 and filled the seat left vacant by the resignation of Poppy Koni.

References

External links
Mmabatho Olive Mokause – People's Assembly
Ms Mmabatho Olive Mokause – Parliament of South Africa

Living people
Year of birth missing (living people)
People from Ga-Segonyana Local Municipality
People from the Northern Cape
Economic Freedom Fighters politicians
21st-century South African politicians
Members of the Northern Cape Provincial Legislature
Members of the National Assembly of South Africa
Members of the National Council of Provinces
Women members of the National Assembly of South Africa
Women members of the National Council of Provinces
Women members of provincial legislatures of South Africa
21st-century South African women politicians